Phillip Nicholas Fitzgerald Hawes (born January 8, 1989) is an American mixed martial artist who competes in the Middleweight division of the Ultimate Fighting Championship.

Background
Hawes started out as a standout wrestler, winning a national 197 lb junior-college wrestling title at Iowa Central Community College, then moving onto Division I Iowa State, where he graduated with a degree in sociology.

Mixed martial arts career

The Ultimate Fighter
After going 3–0 on the regional scene, Hawes was invited as one of the 16 Light Heavyweight fighters invited to the cast The Ultimate Fighter 23.

He lost his entry fight against Andrew Sanchez via unanimous decision.

World Series of Fighting/Contender Series
Hawes signed with World Series of Fighting, debuting at WSOF 31 against Joshua Kay. He won the bout via TKO in the first round.

Hawes would then face future PFL champion Louis Taylor, on short notice as a replacement for Shamil Gamzatov, at WSOF 32. He lost the bout via guillotine submission in round 2.

Hawes participated in Dana White's Contender Series 4 on the 1st August 2017 against Julian Marquez. He lost the fight by knockout after getting hit with a head kick in the second round.

Bellator MMA
After his loss to Marquez, Hawes took two years off and moved to Thailand to train Muay Thai and competed in competitions there. On April 22, 2018, in the MAX Muay Thai Stadium, he won by decision (unanimous), Reza Goodary an Iranian fighter.

Hawes faced Michael Wilcox on June 14, 2019 at Bellator 222. He won the bout via doctor stoppage after the first round when Wilcox was ruled unable to continue.

Brave Combat Federation
Signing with Brave Combat Federation, scoring a first-round submission over Dominik Schober at Brave CF 30, in India, and a TKO victory over Yuri Fraga less than two months later, at Brave CF 34, in Slovenia.

Ultimate Fighting Championship
After picking up three straight wins in Bellator and Brave, Hawes was invited once more to earn a UFC contract on Dana White's Contender Series 32 on September 8, 2020 against Khadzhimurat Bestaev. He won the bout and the contract via TKO in the first round.

Hawes made his UFC debut at UFC 254 on October 24, 2020 against Jacob Malkoun. He finished the fight in the first exchange, knocking Malkoun unconscious in 18 seconds.

Hawes faced Nassourdine Imavov at UFC Fight Night: Blaydes vs. Lewis on February 20, 2021. Hawes survived a late storm by Imavov to win the bout via majority decision.

Hawes faced Kyle Daukaus on May 8, 2021 at UFC on ESPN: Rodriguez vs. Waterson. He won the fight via unanimous decision.

Hawes was scheduled to face Deron Winn at UFC on ESPN 26 on July 17, 2021.  However, Winn was forced to pull out from the event, citing separated rib and torn cartilage, and the bout was rescheduled at UFC Fight Night 194 on October 9, 2021.  In turn, Winn withdrew the day before the event due to health issues. He was briefly expected to be replaced by Chris Curtis, however Hawes declined the bout and it was ultimately scrapped.

Hawes faced Chris Curtis on November 6, 2021 at UFC 268. He lost the fight by KO in the first round.

Hawes was scheduled to face Sam Alvey, replacing Ian Heinisch, on February 5, 2022 at UFC Fight Night 200. However, Hawes withdrew from the bout due to an undisclosed injury and he was replaced by Brendan Allen.

Hawes faced Deron Winn on June 18, 2022 at UFC on ESPN 37. After dominating the first round with his striking, Hawes won the fight via technical knockout in round two. This win earned him the Performance of the Night award.

Hawes faced Roman Dolidze on October 29, 2022, at UFC Fight Night 213. He lost the fight via knockout in round one.

Championships and accomplishments
Ultimate Fighting Championship 
 Performance of the Night (One time)

Mixed martial arts record

|-
|Loss
|align=center|12–4
|Roman Dolidze
|KO (punches)
|UFC Fight Night: Kattar vs. Allen
|
|align=center|1
|align=center|4:09
|Las Vegas, Nevada, United States
|
|-
|Win
|align=center|12–3
|Deron Winn
|TKO (elbows)
|UFC on ESPN: Kattar vs. Emmett
|
|align=center|2
|align=center|4:25
|Austin, Texas, United States
|
|-
|Loss
|align=center|11–3
|Chris Curtis
|KO (punches)
|UFC 268
|
|align=center|1
|align=center|4:27
|New York City, New York, United States
|
|-
|Win
|align=center|11–2
|Kyle Daukaus
|Decision (unanimous)
|UFC on ESPN: Rodriguez vs. Waterson
|
|align=center|3
|align=center|5:00
|Las Vegas, Nevada, United States
|
|-
|Win
|align=center|10–2
|Nassourdine Imavov
|Decision (majority)
|UFC Fight Night: Blaydes vs. Lewis
|
|align=center|3
|align=center|5:00
|Las Vegas, Nevada, United States
|
|-
|Win
|align=center|9–2
|Jacob Malkoun
|KO (punches)
|UFC 254
|
|align=center|1
|align=center|0:18
|Abu Dhabi, United Arab Emirates
|
|-
|Win
|align=center|8–2
|Khadzhimurat Bestaev
|TKO (punches)
|Dana White's Contender Series 32
|
|align=center|1
|align=center|1:18
|Las Vegas, Nevada, United States
|
|-
|Win
|align=center|7–2
|Yuri Fraga
|TKO (punches)
|Brave CF 34
|
|align=center|1
|align=center|4:42
|Ljubljana, Slovenia
|
|-
|Win
|align=center|6–2
|Dominic Schober
|Submission (rear-naked choke)	
|Brave CF 30
|
|align=center|1
|align=center|3:45
|Hyderabad, India
|
|-
|Win
|align=center|5–2
|Michael Wilcox
|TKO (doctor stoppage)
|Bellator 222
|
|align=center|1
|align=center|5:00
|New York City, New York, United States
|
|-
|Loss
|align=center|4–2
|Julian Marquez
|KO (head kick)
|Dana White's Contender Series 4
|
|align=center|2
|align=center|2:20
|Las Vegas, Nevada, United States
|
|-
|Loss
|align=center|4–1
|Louis Taylor
|Submission (guillotine choke)
|WSOF 32
|
|align=center|2
|align=center|2:15
|Everett, Washington, United States
|
|-
|Win
|align=center|4–0
|Joshua Key
|TKO (elbows)
|WSOF 31
|
|align=center|1
|align=center|2:52
|Mashantucket, Connecticut, United States
|
|-
|Win
|align=center|3–0
|Brandon Collins
|Submission (armbar)
|Global Knockout 2
|
|align=center|1
|align=center|3:06
|Jackson, California, United States
|
|-
|Win
|align=center|2–0
|Anthony Pinckard
|TKO (punches)
|Global Knockout: The Return
|
|align=center|2
|align=center|0:25
|Jackson, California, United States
|
|-
|Win
|align=center|1–0
|Brian Cheatham
|TKO (punches)
|Legacy Fighting Championship 28
|
|align=center|2
|align=center|0:55
|San Antonio, Texas, United States
|

Muay Thai record

|-  style="background:#cfc;"
| 2018-04-22|| Win ||align=left| Reza Goodary || MAX Muay Thai - Ultimate Fight || Pattaya, Thailand || Decision (Unanimous) || 3 || 3:00
|-
| colspan=9 | Legend:

See also 
 List of current UFC fighters
 List of male mixed martial artists

References

External links 
  
 

1989 births
Living people
American male mixed martial artists
Middleweight mixed martial artists
Mixed martial artists utilizing collegiate wrestling
Mixed martial artists utilizing Muay Thai
Mixed martial artists utilizing Brazilian jiu-jitsu
People from Little Ferry, New Jersey
Mixed martial artists from New Jersey
Ultimate Fighting Championship male fighters
American Muay Thai practitioners
American practitioners of Brazilian jiu-jitsu
American male sport wrestlers
Amateur wrestlers